Changes is a jazz album recorded by Keith Jarrett, Jack DeJohnette and Gary Peacock in January 1983 during the same sessions that produced the two albums Standards, Vol. 1 and Standards, Vol. 2; the albums together started a long performing and recording career for what became known as the Standards Trio. Changes was released by ECM Records in September 1984.

In 2008 the three albums were collected into a boxed set, Setting Standards: New York Sessions.

Background 
Keith Jarrett, Gary Peacock and Jack DeJohnette had originally worked together on Peacock's 1977 album Tales of Another. In 1983, they came back together after producer Manfred Eicher proposed a trio album to Jarrett. The three joined in a studio in Manhattan, New York for a roughly 2-day session during which they recorded enough material for three albums, the two Standards volumes and Changes, without rehearsing or pre-planning the playlist.

The track "Prism" had been part of the repertoire of Jarrett's "European quartet" in the late 1970s. Two separate recordings of the European quartet playing the song in 1979 were later released: one on the 1989 album Personal Mountains, and one on the 2012 album Sleeper.

Original notes 
The austere and minimalist designs of Jarrett albums' layouts on ECM (a label's trademark) are sometimes filled with notes, poems, quotes or even long stories. In the original 1984 ECM LP and CD issues this Rilke poem can be found:

Reception 
The Allmusic review by Scott Yanow awarded the album 4 stars, stating, "Unlike the other two Keith Jarrett trio recordings from January 1983, this collaboration with bassist Gary Peacock and drummer Jack DeJohnette does not feature standards. The trio performs the 30-minute "Flying" and a 6-minute "Prism," both of them Jarrett originals. "Flying," which has several sections, keeps one's interest throughout while the more concise "Prism" has a beautiful melody. It is a nice change to hear Jarrett (who normally plays unaccompanied) interacting with a trio of superb players.".

Track listing 
All music by Keith Jarrett.

 "Flying Part 1" - 16:06
 "Flying Part 2" - 13:38
 "Prism" - 6:31

Personnel 
 Keith Jarrett – piano
 Jack DeJohnette – drums
 Gary Peacock – double bass

Production
 Manfred Eicher - producer
 Jan Erik Kongshaug - recording engineer
 Barbara Wojirsch - cover design and layout

References 

Keith Jarrett albums
1984 albums
Standards Trio albums
Gary Peacock albums
Jack DeJohnette albums
Albums produced by Manfred Eicher